Rock Creek Township is one of fourteen townships in Carroll County, Indiana. As of the 2010 census, its population was 475 and it contained 185 housing units.

History
Rock Creek Township was organized in 1828.

District School No. 3 at Rockfield was listed on the National Register of Historic Places in 1988.

Geography

Unincorporated towns
 Rockfield

Adjacent townships
 Liberty (east)
 Jackson (southeast)
 Deer Creek (southwest)
 Tippecanoe (west)
 Adams (northwest)

Major highways
  Indiana State Road 25

Cemeteries
The township contains four cemeteries: Brown, Independent Order of Odd Fellows, Mullendore and Parks.

Education
Rock Creek Township residents may obtain a library card at the Delphi Public Library in Delphi.

References
 United States Census Bureau cartographic boundary files
 U.S. Board on Geographic Names

External links
 Indiana Township Association
 United Township Association of Indiana

Townships in Carroll County, Indiana
Lafayette metropolitan area, Indiana
Townships in Indiana